The theory of a biological basis of love has been explored by such biological sciences as evolutionary psychology, evolutionary biology, anthropology and neuroscience. Specific chemical substances such as oxytocin are studied in the context of their roles in producing human experiences and behaviors that are associated with love.

Evolutionary psychology
Evolutionary psychology has proposed several explanations for love. Monkey infants and children are for a very long time dependent on parental help. Love has therefore been seen as a mechanism to promote mutual parental support of children for an extended time period. Another is that sexually transmitted diseases may cause, among other effects, permanently reduced fertility, injury to the fetus, and increase risks during childbirth. This would favor exclusive long-term relationships reducing the risk of contracting an STD.

From the perspective of evolutionary psychology the experiences and behaviors associated with love can be investigated in terms of how they have been shaped by human evolution. For example, it has been suggested that human language has been selected during evolution as a type of "mating signal" that allows potential mates to judge reproductive fitness. Miller described evolutionary psychology as a starting place for further research: "Cognitive neuroscience could try to localize courtship adaptations in the brain. Most importantly, we need much better observations concerning real-life human courtship, including the measurable aspects of courtship that influence mate choice, the reproductive (or at least sexual) consequences of individual variation in those aspects, and the social-cognitive and emotional mechanisms of falling in love." Since Darwin's time there have been similar speculations about the evolution of human interest in music also as a potential signaling system for attracting and judging the fitness of potential mates. It has been suggested that the human capacity to experience love has been evolved as a signal to potential mates that the partner will be a good parent and be likely to help pass genes to future generations. Biologist Jeremy Griffith defines love as 'unconditional selflessness', suggesting utterly cooperative instincts developed in modern humans' ancestor, Australopithecus. Studies of bonobos (a great ape previously referred to as a pygmy chimpanzee) are frequently cited in support of a cooperative past in humans.

Bode and Kushnick undertook a comprehensive review of romantic love from a biological perspective in 2021. They considered the psychology of romantic love, its mechanisms, development across the lifespan, functions, and evolutionary history. Based on the content of that review, they proposed a biological definition of romantic love:

Social psychology 
Social psychological approaches to explaining love have been developed to help further explain the psychological components involved in love. One of the more prominent concepts pertaining to love was proposed by Robert J. Sternberg known as the "Triangular theory of love". Proposed within this theory, love follows a triangular motion, flowing with combinations of different levels within the three sides of the triangle. The three sides are Intimacy, Passion, and Commitment. Within those three sides of the triangle, combinations between two can produce certain types of love and affection. For example, Intimacy plus Passion leads to romantic love while Intimacy plus Commitment leads to compassionate love. The relative amount of love invested is explained by the size and general form of the triangle. Triangular theories do not solely apply to one's own current relationship, they also can be meant for explaining what different levels of intimacy/passion/commitment mean in an imbalanced triangle, or even determine your love triangle for a preference of relationship.

Neurochemistry

The conventional view in biology is that there are three major drives in love – libido, attachment, and partner preference. The primary neurochemicals (neurotransmitters, sex hormones, and neuropeptides) that govern these drives are testosterone, estrogen, dopamine, oxytocin, and vasopressin.

Central dopamine pathways mediate partner preference behavior, while vasopressin in the ventral pallidum and oxytocin in the nucleus accumbens and paraventricular hypothalamic nucleus mediate partner preference and attachment behaviors. Sex drive is modulated primarily by activity in the mesolimbic dopamine pathway (ventral tegmental area and nucleus accumbens). Trace amines (e.g., phenethylamine and tyramine) play a critical role in regulating neuronal activity in the dopaminergic pathways of the central nervous system.

Testosterone and estrogen contribute to these drives by modulating activity within dopamine pathways. Adequate brain levels of testosterone seem important for both human male and female sexual behavior. Norepinephrine and serotonin have a less significant, contributing role through their neuromodulatory effects upon dopamine and oxytocin release in certain pathways.

The chemicals triggered that are responsible for passionate love and long-term attachment love seem to be more particular to the activities in which both persons participate rather than to the nature of the specific people involved. Individuals who have recently fallen in love show higher levels of cortisol.

Role of the limbic system
The role of the limbic system in emotion was first explained by James Papez in 1937 within his paper titled “A proposed mechanism of emotion.” The model is known as the  Papez circuit. the Papez circuit highlighted the presence of neuronal pathways between vestibular system and limbic system. The vestibular apparatus is in the inner ear this apparatus coordinates the body balance and movement. this requires extensive neuronal networking. Vestibular stimulation can cause changes in mood and emotion. vestibular stimulation by influencing hypothalamus can impact emotions either independently or as part of the general limbic system networks. These emotions can include extreme passivity, loss of drive/motivation, excessive eating and drinking, and rage and violent behavior. Studies show Romantic Love uses reward and motivation systems to focus on a specific individual. The limbic cortical regions process individual emotion factors. In A General Theory of Love, three professors of psychiatry from UCSF provide an overview of the scientific theories and findings relating to the role of the limbic system in love, attachment and social bonding.  They advance the hypothesis that our nervous systems are not self-contained, but rather demonstrably attuned to those around us and those with whom we are most close.  This empathy, which they call limbic resonance, is a capacity which we share, along with the anatomical characteristics of the limbic areas of the brain, with all other mammals. Their work builds on previous studies of the importance of physical contact and affection in social and cognitive development, such as the experiments conducted by Harry Harlow on rhesus monkeys, which first established the biological consequences of isolation.

Brain imaging
Brain scanning techniques such as functional magnetic resonance imaging have been used to investigate brain regions that seem to be involved in producing the human experience of love.

In 2000, a study led by Semir Zeki and Andreas Bartels of University College London concluded that at least two areas of the brain become more active when in love. These were foci in the media insula, which the brain associates with instinct, and part of the anterior cingulate cortex, which is associated with feelings of euphoria.

Ortigue et al. found that an unconscious prime of the name of a romantic partner activated similar brain regions as when subjects were consciously aware of seeing partners' faces. Subliminal priming with either a beloved's name or a favorite hobby activated emotion and motivational brain regions: caudate nucleus, insula, bilateral fusiform regions, parahippocampal gyrus, right angular gyrus, occipital cortex, and cerebellum. However, the love prime evoked more activation in bilateral angular gyri and bilateral fusiform regions than the hobby prime. These regions are associated with integrating abstract representations, and the angular gyrus in particular is involved with abstract representations of the self. The authors also found a correlation (r=0.496, p=0.002) between activation of a region of the angular gyrus with a passionate-love scale measuring subjective feelings of love.

Love and motivation

Conscious thoughts about a romantic partner activate brain regions related to reward and motivation. Ortigue et al. investigated whether unconscious priming by a partner's name could also affect motivation. They found that priming by either a beloved or a favorite hobby improved reaction times in identifying whether a string of letters was a word or not compared against priming by a neutral friend. The authors suggest this effect happens because a beloved's name "may call for a goal-directed state" and produce "dopaminergic-driven facilitation effects." Joseph Butler believed the human race was made of six senses instead of five. The sixth sense being empathy. Empathy is what makes humans different from other mammals. Empathy allows humans to experience love and to build bonds. The moral that humans gain from empathy allow them to repair and rebuild bonds based from empathy.

See also
Biology and sexual orientation
Interpersonal attraction
Religious views on love
Lovesickness
Neuroanatomy of intimacy
Oxytocin

References

External links

 The Nature of Love (1958) - Harry Harlow, American Psychologist, 13, 573-685
 Harry Harlow - A Science Odyssey: People and Experiments
  - eScienceCommons: The Science of Love
  - HowStuffWorks: How Love Works
  - The Age: Your dopamine or mine ?

Interpersonal attraction
Sociobiology
Love